Ndlambe Local Municipality is an administrative area in the Sarah Baartman District of the Eastern Cape in South Africa, with its capital at Port Alfred. It is a predominantly rural area with agriculture and tourism dominating the economy.

It encompasses the following towns:
 Kenton-on-Sea
 Boknes
 Bathurst
 Boesmansriviermond
 Alexandria
 Cannon Rocks

Politics 

The municipal council consists of twenty members elected by mixed-member proportional representation. Ten councillors are elected by first-past-the-post voting in ten wards, while the remaining ten are chosen from party lists so that the total number of party representatives is proportional to the number of votes received. In the election of 1 November 2021 the African National Congress (ANC) won a majority of eleven seats on the council.
The following table shows the results of the election.

Main places
The 2001 census divided the municipality into the following main places:

References

External links
 Official website

Local municipalities of the Sarah Baartman District Municipality